London Calling is a 1979 album by The Clash, and its title track.

London Calling may also refer to:

 "Ici Londres!" ("London calling!"), slogan of Radio Londres, broadcast 1940–1944 by the BBC in London to Nazi-occupied France

Film and television
 London Calling, a 2009 film by director Babbar Subhash
 "London Calling" (Ugly Betty), a 2010 episode of the TV series
 "London Calling", a 2008 episode of Instant Star
 London Calling, a 2012 BBC music documentary series presented by Jools Holland

Literature
 London Calling (magazine), later renamed BBC Worldwide, then BBC On Air
 London Calling (Bloor novel), by Edward Bloor, 2006
 London Calling (Craig novel), by James Craig, 2011
 London Calling (Sheridan novel), by Sara Sheridan, 2013
 Tracer - London Calling, a 2020 Overwatch comic limited series

Music
 London Calling (festival), a music festival in Amsterdam
 London Calling! (musical), a 1923 musical revue by Noël Coward
 "London Calling" (song), by The Clash, 1979
 London Calling, a 2009 album by Babutsa
 London Calling: Live in Hyde Park, a 2010 concert video by Bruce Springsteen and the E Street Band

Other uses
 London Calling (play), by Geoffrey Kerr, 1930

See also

 London Falling, a comic strip